Samaiji is a village development committee in Dadeldhura District in the Mahakali Zone of western Nepal. It is named after the name of god Samaiji (one of the form of lord Shiva). It is divided into 9 wards.
Ward no: 1 Pali
Ward no: 2 Bakayal
Ward no: 3 Bajkot
Ward no: 4 Khateda
Ward no: 5 Mudrad
Ward no: 6 Silangi
Ward no: 7 Baida
Ward no: 8 Mahargaun
Ward no: 9 koteli
The headquarters is located at a small town named Puilek. It is around 14 km from the district headquarters. The major destination of this V.D.C. includes the natural beauties and some temples. Some famous temples are Kola Samaiji, Pali Samaiji, Shikhar Samaiji etc. There are 2 higher secondary schools in the V.D.C. And a graveled road has made it possible to touch the district headquarters. The facilities like water, sanitation, telephone and electricity are accessible to the locals but they are still lacking proper education, hospital and even transportation at the need. One has to walk 14 km to reach the nearest hospital, bank and for all other basic things. At the time of the 1991 Nepal census it had a population of 2184 people living in 382 individual households.

References

External links
UN map of the municipalities of  Dadeldhura District

Populated places in Dadeldhura District